Blanca Jiménez Castillo (born 26 September 1965) is a Mexican politician affiliated with the PAN. She currently serves as Deputy of the LXII Legislature of the Mexican Congress representing Puebla.

References

1965 births
Living people
People from Puebla (city)
Women members of the Chamber of Deputies (Mexico)
National Action Party (Mexico) politicians
21st-century Mexican politicians
21st-century Mexican women politicians
Deputies of the LXII Legislature of Mexico
Members of the Chamber of Deputies (Mexico) for Puebla